Griffin Dorsey (born March 5, 1999) is an American professional soccer player who plays for Major League Soccer club Houston Dynamo.

Career

Youth, College and Amateur
Dorsey played three years with U.S. Soccer Development Academy side Colorado Rush SC. He played college soccer at Indiana University in 2017. During two seasons with the Hoosiers, Dorsey made 44 appearances, scoring eight goals, and tallying eleven assists while helping IU reach the NCAA Tournament both years.  During 2017, Indiana reached the NCAA Final, finishing runners up to Stanford.  In 2018, Dorsey and Indiana finished the season as Big Ten Conference regular season and Conference Tournament champions.  For personal accolades, Dorsey was named a 2nd-Team Freshman All-American by Top Drawer Soccer and College Soccer News, 2nd-Team All-Big Ten, and made the Big Ten All-Freshman Team in 2017.  For 2018, he was named a 2nd-Team All-American by United Soccer Coaches and College Soccer News, 3rd-Team All-American by Top Drawer Soccer, and 1st-Team All-Big Ten

While at Indiana Dorsey also played in the Premier Development League for Colorado Rapids U-23 during the summer.

Professional

Toronto FC 
On January 4, 2019, Dorsey left Indiana to sign a Generation Adidas contract with Major League Soccer ahead of the 2019 MLS SuperDraft. On January 11, 2019, Dorsey was drafted in the first round (6th overall) of the 2019 MLS SuperDraft by Toronto FC.

Dorsey made his professional debut on February 19, 2019, starting in a 4–0 CONCACAF Champions League loss to Panamanian side Independiente. He made his MLS debut on June 29, coming off the bench in a 1–1 draw with D.C. United.  Dorsey spent the bulk of the 2019 season on loan with the second team, Toronto FC II.  He scored his first professional goal on June 12 in a 3–3 draw against North Texas SC.  He made 22 appearances, scored 1 goal, and had 4 assists for TFCII. On May 11, 2021, Dorsey was waived by Toronto FC.

Houston Dynamo 
On July 5, 2021, Dorsey signed with MLS side Houston Dynamo. He made his Dynamo debut on July 24, starting in a 1–1 draw against the San Jose Earthquakes. On September 11, he scored his first goal for the Dynamo, scoring in the first minute of a 3–0 win over Austin FC.  On September 18, Dorsey scored once and added an assist to help Houston to a 3–2 win over Texas Derby rivals FC Dallas.  He was named to the bench for the MLS Team of the Week following his performance against Dallas.  Dorsey ended the season with 2 goals and 3 assists from 20 appearances and was named the Dynamo Young Player of the Year.  Despite a solid season from Dorsey, it was a poor season for the Dynamo as a team, finishing last in the Western Conference and missing out on the playoffs.

Dorsey made his first appearance of the 2022 season in week 1, getting the start in a 0–0 draw with Real Salt Lake.  On August 31 he scored his first goal of the season to give Houston a 2–1 win over LAFC, cutting in from the touchline and dribbling past three defenders before curling the ball into the left side netting.  Dorsey split time as the starting right back with Zeca throughout the season.  Dorsey ended the regular season with 1 goal and 3 assists in 27 appearances, 19 of them starts.  He also made 2 starts in the Open Cup.  It was another disappointing season for Houston, failing to qualify for the playoffs after finishing 13th in the West.

Career statistics
As of February 17, 2023

Honors 

Individual
 Dynamo Young Player of the Year: 2021

References

External links
 
 
 Indiana bio

1999 births
Living people
American soccer players
Association football forwards
Colorado Rapids U-23 players
Houston Dynamo FC players
Indiana Hoosiers men's soccer players
Major League Soccer players
People from Evergreen, Colorado
Soccer players from Colorado
Sportspeople from Colorado
Toronto FC draft picks
Toronto FC players
Toronto FC II players
USL League One players
USL League Two players
United States men's under-20 international soccer players
United States men's youth international soccer players